Patiriisocius marinistellae is a Gram-negative, aerobic, rod-shaped and non-spore-forming bacterium from the genus of Patiriisocius which has been isolated from the surface of the starfish Patiria pectinifera from the coast of Hokkaido.

References

Flavobacteria
Bacteria described in 2020